Jerald Ray "Jake" Brown (March 22, 1948 – December 18, 1981) was a  Major League Baseball player who played with the San Francisco Giants in . He was used primarily as a pinch hitter, but also played the outfield.

Brown is most notable because he made it to the majors after nearly severing his left forearm in an industrial accident at a sheet-metal plant in early 1974.

Brown was just 33 years old when he died of leukemia in Houston, Texas on December 18, 1981.

References

External links

1948 births
1981 deaths
African-American baseball players
Major League Baseball outfielders
Baseball players from Mississippi
San Francisco Giants players
Southern Jaguars baseball players
Deaths from cancer in Texas
Deaths from leukemia
People from Sumrall, Mississippi
20th-century African-American sportspeople